Hugo Ticciati (born April 12, 1980) is a British-born violinist, living in Sweden. He has been successful in several worldwide events such as the Gotland Chamber Music Festival (Sweden), the St. Denis-Festival (Paris), and the Festival Internacional Cervantino. He has also begun his own Festival called the O/MODƏRNT, in Sweden.

Career
At the age of twelve he entered the world of fame in the Edinburgh Festival and at Queen Elizabeth Hall. Since then, Ticciati has been performing with several orchestras from England, Romania, Sweden, the Far East, Estonia, and the USA.
Some of his career highlights have taken place in concertos performed in the Baltic Sea Festival in Sweden, the Carnegie Hall, and the Hermitage Music Festival held in St Petersburg.
Ticciati currently gives regular concerts in important halls in Europe and in the Far East. He plays accompanied by pianists such as Staffan Scheja, Svetlana Navarssadian, Sophia Rahman, Michael Tsalka and Henrik Måwe.

Hugo gives masterclasses and seminars on violin teaching and lectures on music-related subjects all over the world. In autumn 2008, he was invited to become the guest violin teacher and lecturer in music history at a new university in New York. Hugo’s teaching basically searches for ways to apply the physical and spiritual aspects of meditation to practicing art, playing and living in music.
 
Hugo started studying violin in London, before going to the University of Toronto. He continued studying with Russian violinists Nina and Oleg Balabina in Sweden, where he now is considered a Swedish citizen. Hugo has won the international competitions Giovani Talenti and Rovere d’Oro at San Bartolomeo al Mare, Italy (2002), and the Mendelssohn Cup in Bari, Italy (2004). In 2007 he was admitted as a Fellow of the Royal Schools of Music in the United Kingdom.

Projects
Ticciati has started a new festival named O/MODƏRNT (which means “Unmodern”) as artistic director at Ulrikdals Palace Theatre Confidencen, in Sweden.

Ticciati works in the contemporary music world with composers such as Albert Schnelzer, Anders Hillborg, Djuro Zivkovic, Leonardo Coral, Andrea Tarrodi, Tobias Broström, Thomas Jennefelt, Sergei Yevtushenko and Esaias Järnegard. Within other projects, he is working with Bill Connor (English composer), on “An Improvised Violin Concerto”. Over the next seasons, Ticciati will be performing concertos in Russia, Romania, Sweden, England and Mexico.

Music Festivals
Ticciati has been invited to several renowned musical events, such as the Gotland Chamber Music Festival (Sweden), the St. Denis-Festival (Paris), and the Festival Internacional Cervantino, which is annually held in Guanajuato, Mexico. In 2011, Sweden was a guest of honor in FIC and was represented by Angereds Teater, Åke Parmerud, Stockholm Jazz Orchestra, and Hugo Ticciati, who worked with Michael Tsalka.

References 

Living people
British emigrants to Sweden
Swedish violinists
1980 births
21st-century violinists
21st-century Swedish male musicians